Valley of the Mists is a 1982 role-playing game adventure published by Fantasy Games Unlimited for Bushido.

Contents
Valley of the Mists is the first adventure scenario for Bushido, designed for the 2nd edition rules, and the adventure centers around adventure in the Hida Province of Nippon.

Reception
William A. Barton reviewed Valley of the Mists in The Space Gamer No. 54. Barton commented that "Valley of the Mists is a strong starter as the first Bushido adventure.  If subsequent efforts are as well-done, Bushido aficionados will have much to look forward to in upcoming excursions through Nippon."

Mike Polling reviewed Valley of the Mists for White Dwarf #32, giving it an overall rating of 10 out of 10, and stated that "Rarely have I come across a module so carefully and lovingly worked out, and so exciting. playing this has been one of the high points of my role-playing and games-mastering career."

Reviews
 Different Worlds #23 (Aug., 1982)

References

Role-playing game adventures
Role-playing game supplements introduced in 1982